Duchess is a rank of nobility, the female equivalent of Duke.

Duchess may also refer to:

Arts and entertainment

Fictional characters
Duchess (Alice's Adventures in Wonderland)
Lashina, a DC Comics character also known as "Duchess"
Duchess, a character in Foster's Home for Imaginary Friends, an American animated television series
"Duchess", the code name for the title character in the American animated television series Archer
Duchess, a female white cat in the 1970 Disney animated film The Aristocats
Duchess (of Loughborough), a royal locomotive from the Thomas & Friends franchise
The Duchess (of Boxford), a person from the Thomas & Friends franchise
 The Duchess, from the video game American McGee's Alice

Music
"Duchess" (Genesis song), 1980
"Duchess" (The Stranglers song), 1979
"Duchess", a song by Scott Walker from Scott 4

Other arts and entertainment
The Duchess (film), 2008
The Duchess (TV series), 2020
The Duchess, a 1998 book by Amanda Foreman

Places
Duchess, Queensland, a township in Cloncurry, Australia
Duchess, Alberta, a village in Canada
Duchess Landing, Oklahoma, a US settlement
Duchess Theatre, London, England

People
The Duchess, nickname of convicted murderer Juanita Spinelli
Norma-Jean Wofford (c. 1942–2005), nicknamed "The Duchess", rhythm guitarist with Bo Diddley
The Duchess,Valentine The Third of 22nd century Canadian Descendent Margaret Wolfe Hungerford

Transport
Duchess (sponge hooking boat), a historic boat in Tarpon Springs, Florida
Beechcraft Duchess, an American monoplane
Duchess class, a name for unstreamlined LMS Coronation Class British railway locomotives

Other uses
, any of several British ships
Duchess (restaurant), a restaurant chain in Connecticut, USA
Duchess (solitaire), a card game
Duchess lorikeet (Charmosyna margarethae), a species of parrot
Duchess potatoes, a cuisine item
The Duchess Stakes, a Canadian horse race
The Duchess (horse) (1813–1836), British Thoroughbred racehorse
Duchess, a brand of packaged sweet baked goods made by Carolina Foods
Duchess, Australian English term for a dressing table
"The Duchess", a limousine once owned by abdicated UK king Edward VIII and later restored by Morgan Murphy
 Duchesses (women's cricket), a women's cricket team from South Africa
 Duchess (chess variant), a 2-6 players chess variants.

See also

Dutchess (disambiguation)